David Austin may refer to:

 David C. H. Austin (1926–2018), rose breeder and author
 David Austin (American football), former head football coach for Middlebury College
 David Austin (cartoonist) (1935–2005), who worked for The Guardian and Private Eye
 David Austin (singer) (born 1962), British singer
 David Austin (actor) (born 1967), New Zealand actor

See also 
 David Austen, English cricketer